Agnotherium is a genus of large sized carnivoran mammals, belonging to the Amphicyonidae ("bear dogs"), which has been found in Western Europe, and possibly Northern Africa, and lived during the Late Miocene epoch. Despite only being known from fragmentary remains, the genus notable for hypercarnivorous adaptions, which have been said to represent the "apex" among its family.

History and naming 
The genus Agnotherium was created by Johann Jakob von Kaup, based on a single molar (HLMD Din 1143) found in the Eppelsheim Formation, more well known as Dinotheriensande, located in southwestern Germany. Kaup, who described many Eppelsheim mammals, including such famous ones as Deinotherium, Machairodus and Chalicotherium, named the fragmentary material Agnotherium antiquum. He noted that he only reason he gave a name to this fragmentary taxon was to "draw naturalists' attention to this genus" since it has teeth unlike any animal he had ever seen before. Over the next 180 years the genus was involved in taxonomic uncertainty, with various material being assigned to it, of which most was later thrown out. Kaup himself added to the confusion by renaming his found into "Agnocyon", since the name Agnotherium was "not fitting for a predator". Kuss synonymized the genus Tomocyon with Agnotherium, which led to a second species, A. grivense, being recognized by several authors. This, however, has been disputed since, and Agnotherium is now regarded as monotypic. 

In 2017, more material belonging to Agnotherium was unearthed in Eppelsheim, and designated as its paratype (MNHM Epp 117-2017). It consists of a partial left juvenile mandible, with several teeth being either in eruption or still in the crypt. This find served to clarify the understanding of this obscure genus, and even allowed for a reconstruction, the first of its kind, to be made and displayed in the Naturhistorisches Museum Mainz. The new remains also allowed for the confirmation of fossils assigned to Agnotherium from Switzerland, consisting of a partial mandibular ramus (NMB CM 242) and the fragment of a right ulna (NMB CM 243) respectively, and a few isolated teeth (MNCN 79044a-c) from Spain to the genus.

Several remains from Africa, including Kenya and Morocco, have been attributed to Agnotherium, as species A. kiptalami, in the past, but have since been moved to the genus Myacyon. Only material from Tunisia has been tentatively assigned to cf. Agnotherium antiquum by Morlo et al., although if the authors state hat they can't confidently demonstrate that it belongs to the genus, due to the lack of definitive Agnotherium upper teeth to compare them to, while other authors consider it too to belong to Myacyon cf. kiptalami. The Tunisian material consists of a right maxilla fragment (NOM T-370), proximal left radius fragment (NOM T-179) and a metatarsal V (NOM T-2269).

The name is derived from the Ancient Greek from Greek ἁγνός agnos, "chaste" and θηρίον therium "beast", although it alternatively has been translated as "unknown beast". This translation does not seem to be grammatically correct, but Kaup's original description puts a lot of emphasis on how scarce the remains actually are, so it may be closer to his intention. The species name antiquum come from Latin, and means "old" or "ancient".

Geographical and temporal distribution 
Agnotherium was distributed across Western Europe, with Tunisian material referred to it being questionable, during the Vallesian epoch. More specifically, the genus is mostly restricted to the MN9 zonation, although the youngest remains may date to the earliest parts of MN10.

Both the holotype and the paratype were found at the site of Eppelsheim, which itself is part of the Eppelsheim Formation, is located in the state Rhineland-Palatinate of southwestern Germany. Agnotherium was found at the youngest deposits of the formation, dating to about 9.7 Ma, and therefore to the boundary of MN9/MN10. The Eppelsheim specimens also represent the youngest material belonging to the genus.
The locality of Charmoille, located in the canton of Jura, Switzerland, belong to the Ajoie member of the Bois de Raube formation, and dates to 10.8 ± 0.4 Ma. 
Finally, the site of Bled Douarah, which is located in the central parts of Tunisia, belongs to the Beglia formation, and has been dated to around 11-13 Ma.

Description 

Agnotherium antiquum was a lion-sized amphicyonid, its weight having been estimated at 158kg and 200 to 275kg, respectively. This makes it one of the largest carnivorans in its habitat, although smaller than several other Amphicyonidae, such as Tomocyon, several species of Amphicyon (including the contemporary A. eppelheimensis) and Ischyrocyon.

It differs from all other amphicyonids in the massive reduction of detention, which is the most trenchant, and therefore specialized to hypercarnivory, of all amphicyonids, with the possible exception of Ammitocyon. The premolars p1, p2 and p3 and the molar m3 are completely absent, as are the metaconids and entoconids cusps on the teeth on m1 and m2 as well as the paraconid on m2. Instead it has an enormous canine, which dominates the mandibular body, leaving no space for p1-3 to develop. It also developed shear facets on both m1 and m2, yet another adaptation to hypercarnivory.

The geologically younger specimens from Eppelsheim possess a cristid on the lingual paraconid, which the older ones lack.

The ulna is robust and slightly curved, resembling that of Amphicyon and bears, but with a much more robust, short but broad olecranon that curves laterally to enlarge the attachment area for Musculus triceps brachii, not unlike in Panthera. The forearm is also proportionally longer than in Amphicyon.

Phylogeny and evolution 

Agnotherium belongs to the subfamily Thaumastocyoninae, originally erected by Hürzeler (1940), which is defined by the complete suppression of m1 metaconid, reduction of the premolars, except the p4, which is reinforced, and the oblique abrasion of the teeth, and possesses hypercarnivorous tendencies. Within this subfamily, Agnotherium is closely related to the genera Tomocyon and Thaumastocyon, and it has been suggested, based on the morphology of m2 and p4, that it may be a descendant of  the Middle Miocene Thaumastocyon bourgeoisi.

Agnotherium has been recovered as a derived Thaumastocyonine closely related to a Thaumastocyon + Ammitocyon clade by a phylogeny conducted in a later study, although the authors note that Agnotherium position is not well resolved due to the lack of upper jaw material attributable to it.

Below is the cladogram based on cranial, mandibular and dental characters, after Morales et al., 2021:

Paleobiology 
Agnotherium took the trend of thaumastocyonines to become more hypercarnivorous to an extreme, with its dentition being the most trenchant of all amphicyonids, without the grinding or bone-crushing features many other bear dogs possess. The Eppelsheim material also showcases greater adaptations to hypercarnivory than the geologically older ones.

The short olecranon, and the robust triceps, indicate that Agnotherium had a much stronger forearm than Amphicyon, which was used to fix and demobilize large prey. This points towards Agnotherium being an ambush hunter similar to modern big cats, but more heavily built. Its long forearms also suggest that it was likely faster than Amphicyon. Since both Panthera species living in woodlands as well as bears are solitary, and are the best comparison as forest-inhabiting ambush hunters, it is likely that Agnotherium also lived a solitary lifestyle. 

Despite only fragmentary remains being known, it is possible to reconstruct parts of Agnotheriums ontogeny thanks to the mandible of a subadult (about 2 or 3 years of age) found at Eppelsheim. It showcases that the incisors i1-2 are the first teeth to erupt, followed by m1 and afterwards p4, m2 and i3. The large canine is the last tooth to fully erupt. This tooth eruption pattern is more similar to Ursus than Canis among extant carnivorans, but the extinct ursid Agriotherium even more so, in which the molars erupted almost simultaneously once the animal reached its full size.

Paleoecology 

The site of Eppelsheim was located at the proto-Rhine, which flowed slowly and meandering through a wide valley, its banks covered by riparian forest. A woodland mosaic, with forests alongside relatively treeless steppes, covered the landscape. The temperatures were subtropical, and the slightly older locality of Sprendlingen has been estimated to have a mean annual temperature of 11–15°C or 13.6–15.8°C respectively. 
Here Agnotherium existed alongside two more large predators: the lionsized sabertooth cat Machairodus aphanistus and the even larger beardog Amphicyon eppelsheimensis. A. eppelheimensis was a taxon adapted to bonecrushing, but both Agnotherium and Machairodus represent hypercarnivorous species. The much more heavily built Agnotherium may have inhabited a different habitat, or hunted different prey, than the felid, as has been suggested for the Amphicyonid Magericyon and Machairodus from Batallones. Alternatively, the high biomass of the locality may have allowed them to coexist. Smaller carnivorans from the locality include the leopard-sized machairodontine Promegantereon and red panda relative Simocyon, and the civet like hyaena Ictitherium. Herbivores are represented by proboscideans such as Deinotherium and Tetralophodon, three species of rhinos (Aceratherium incisivum, Brachypotherium goldfussi and Dihoplus schleiermacheri), Chalicotherium, tapirs, the horse Hippotherium primigenium, several species of deer (belonging to the genera Amphiprox and Euprox), suids such as Propalaeochoerus and Microstonyx, the bovid Miotragocerus and the tragulid Dorcatherium. The enigmatic primate Paidopithex, with possible affinities to the Pliopithecidae, has been found here as well. 

The slightly older locality of Charmoille also represents a subtropical woodland associated with the presence of water, and the fauna shares many taxa with Eppelsheim (such as Agnotherium, Machairodus, Hippotherium, Deinotherium, Dorcatherium and Euprox). Agnotherium also coexisted with Hippotherium and Euprox at Pedregueras 2A.

The presence of crocodiles such as Euthecodon at Bled Douarah showcases that what is now Sahara was once covered by extensive river systems, while fossilized wood possibly indicates a tropical woodland. Alongside Agnotherium/Myacyon, the fauna once again included Machairodus, as well as the hyaenas Percrocuta, Protictitherium and Lycyaena, the barbourofelid Vampyrictis, the primitive giraffe Palaeotragus, the anthracothere Libycosaurus and possibly the proboscidean Choerolophodon.

References 

Miocene mammals of Europe
Miocene mammals of Africa
Miocene bear dogs
Fossil taxa described in 1833
Prehistoric carnivoran genera